Mirza Sahiban  is a 1947 Indian Hindi-language romantic drama film directed by K. Amarnath, starring Noor Jehan and Trilok Kapoor in the lead roles. It is based on the folktale of Mirza Sahiban and was the fourth highest grossing Indian film of 1947.

Cast
 Noor Jehan as Sahiban		
 Trilok Kapoor as Mirza
 Misra as Choudhary Sahib
 Roop Kamal as Noora, Sahiban's friend
 Rekha as Chhati, Mirza's younger sister. 
 Ibrahim as Miyanji
 Laxman as young Mirza
 Baby Anwari as young Sahiban
 Amirbano as Mirza's widowed mother
 Gulab as Choudhary Sahib's wife
 Gope as Pumman

Music
The music for the film was composed by Late Pandit Amarnath, with lyrics penned by Qamar Jalalabadi, Aziz Kashmiri. The soundtrack consists of eleven songs, featuring vocals by Noor Jehan, G. M. Durrani, Zohrabai Ambalewali, and Shamshad Begum. There was a dance by Cuckoo who played a wedding dancer in an uncredited role.

References

External links
 

1947 films
1940s Hindi-language films
Indian romantic drama films
1947 romantic drama films
Indian black-and-white films
Films directed by K. Amarnath
Films based on Indian folklore